Wendell Nascimento Borges (born 20 July 1993), commonly known as Wendell, is a Brazilian professional footballer who plays as a left-back for Portuguese club FC Porto.

Beginning his career in his native Brazil, Wendell had spells at Iraty, Londrina, Paraná Clube and Grêmio. He signed for Bayer Leverkusen in February 2014, for whom he has made over 200 appearances.

Despite being capped at U20 and U23 level, Wendell is yet to make a senior international appearance for Brazil; his only call-up to date came in October 2016 for the 2018 FIFA World Cup qualifying games against Bolivia and Venezuela.

Club career
On 27 February 2014, he signed for Bayer Leverkusen on a 5-year deal after playing for various teams in Brazil, including Iraty, Londrina, and Gremio.  
He made his debut for the team on 15 August, replacing Sebastian Boenisch for the last 19 minutes of a 6–0 win away to sixth-tier SV Alemannia Waldalgesheim in the first round of the DFB-Pokal. His Bundesliga debut came on 21 September, playing the entirety of a 1–4 defeat at VfL Wolfsburg. On 13 March he scored his first goal for the club, opening a 4–0 home win over VfB Stuttgart.

International career
Wendell got his first call up to the senior Brazil side for 2018 FIFA World Cup qualifiers against Bolivia and Venezuela in October 2016, replacing Marcelo.

Career statistics

Honours
Londrina
Campeonato Paranaense do Interior: 2013

Porto
Primeira Liga: 2021–22
Taça de Portugal: 2021–22
Supertaça Cândido de Oliveira: 2022
Taça da Liga: 2022-23

Brazil U20
Toulon Tournament: 2014

Individual
Best Campeonato Paranaense full-back: 2013
Bundesliga Team of the Season: 2017–18

References

External links

Profile at the FC Porto website

1993 births
Living people
Sportspeople from Fortaleza
Brazilian footballers
Association football fullbacks
Iraty Sport Club players
Londrina Esporte Clube players
Paraná Clube players
Grêmio Foot-Ball Porto Alegrense players
Bayer 04 Leverkusen players
FC Porto players
Campeonato Brasileiro Série A players
Campeonato Brasileiro Série B players
Bundesliga players
Primeira Liga players
Brazilian expatriate footballers
Brazilian expatriate sportspeople in Germany
Expatriate footballers in Germany
Expatriate footballers in Portugal